SMPT:e (from StoltMorsePortnoyTrewavas) is the first album of the progressive rock supergroup Transatlantic.  The title is a play on words: it's both a combination of the band members' initials and a reference about SMPTE, a type of time code used in recording technology.

The song "In Held ('Twas) in I" was originally recorded by progressive rock band Procol Harum in 1967 (released on the album Shine on Brightly, in 1968) and was widely regarded as the first progressive rock epic.

Track listing
All songs by Neal Morse, Mike Portnoy, Pete Trewavas, and Roine Stolt, except where noted.

Limited edition bonus disc

Personnel
Transatlantic
Roine Stolt — electric and 12-string acoustic guitars, lead vocals (4), Mellotrons, percussion
Neal Morse — keyboards, lead (all but 4) and backing vocals, acoustic and electric guitars
Pete Trewavas — bass, lead (all but 4) and backing vocals, Moog Taurus pedals
Mike Portnoy — drums, backing vocals

Production
Arranged & Produced by Transatlantic
Engineered by Chris Cubeta
Additional Engineering by Stewart Every (for Pete's recordings at the Racket Club, UK)
Mixed by Rich Mouser at The Mouse House, Los Angeles, CA November 1999
Mastered by Vlado Meller at Sony Music Studios NYC January 2000
Cover art and additional booklet art by Per Nordin (nota bene: 2 different covers. This article displays the European cover. The US / International cover is different, also by Per Nordin). The reason for 2 different covers was that the European company InsideOut was tired of so many blue covers. The artist therefore made this cover for the European edition (now rarely seen in print).

Charts

References

2000 debut albums
Transatlantic (band) albums
Inside Out Music albums
Metal Blade Records albums